The cultivation, transport, sale, purchase, and possession of all forms of cannabis has been illegal in Bangladesh since the late 1980s, but enforcement efforts are lax and the drug continues to be popular there. Since 2017, enforcement has become harsh on marijuana laws and the government has been cracking down on cannabis.

Prohibition

The Bangladesh government, under dictator Ershad, banned the cultivation of cannabis in 1987, and banned its sale in 1989. Ershad had seized power in the 1982 Bangladesh coup d'état, a bloodless coup. The current law governing cannabis in Bangladesh is the Narcotics Control Act 1990; the Act gives the courts discretionary ability to impose the death sentence for possession of cannabis over two kilograms.

Culture
Cannabis and opium have been traditionally used by Bangladeshi people. Every year a festival is held in Kushtia, Bangladesh, in memorial of the late folk singer Fakir Lalon Shah. Many folk gather every year at the festival there are westerners and people from West Bengal, India as well. It can be seen that during the festival period people are singing Bengali folk music and smoking marijuana out of a chillum freely. All these means is to be connected with each other spiritually and remembering the great Lalon Shah through music. During the festival period marijuana consumption is tolerated by authorities.

Cultivation
The 2005 UNODC Bangladesh country profile notes:

See also 

 Methamphetamine in Bangladesh

References